The olive whistler (Pachycephala olivacea) or olivaceous whistler, is a species of bird in the family Pachycephalidae, the whistlers, that is native to southeastern Australia.

Taxonomy and systematics

Subspecies 
Five subspecies are recognized:
 P. o. macphersoniana – White, HL, 1920: Found in eastern Australia
 P. o. olivacea – Vigors & Horsfield, 1827: Found in southeastern Australia
 P. o. bathychroa – Schodde & Mason, 1999: Found in southeastern Australia
 P. o. apatetes – Schodde & Mason, 1999: Found in Tasmania and islands in the Bass Strait, Australia
 P. o. hesperus – Schodde & Mason, 1999: Found in southern Australia

Description
To an untrained eye, they can be mistaken for female golden whistlers. The male has a dark grey head, pale grey breast and red-tinged buff belly and rump. The female lacks the red tinge, and has brown underparts. The legs, bill and eyes of both sexes are a brown-black. The melodious call has been likened to I'll wet you or you're cranky, and is possibly the most musical of all whistlers.

Distribution and habitat
The olive whistler is found from the McPherson Range in far south east Queensland south through New South Wales and into Victoria and south eastern South Australia, Flinders and King Islands and Tasmania.

The habitat is mainly wet forest, and Antarctic beech (Nothofagus moorei) forest in northern New South Wales.

Behaviour and ecology

Breeding 
Olive whistlers nest from September to December, raising one brood during this period. A clutch of two or three oval eggs are laid, 20 x 28 mm and shiny cream with brown, black and lavender spots and blotches (more on larger end).

Food and feeding 
It is predominantly insectivorous.

Status
An uncommon species, it is considered of least concern on the global IUCN Red List, but vulnerable in New South Wales due to habitat fragmentation and feral cats and foxes.

References

External links 
 BirdLife Species Factsheet
Olive whistler at the Department of Environment and Conservation, NSW

olive whistler
Birds of New South Wales
Birds of Tasmania
Birds of Victoria (Australia)
Endemic birds of Australia
olive whistler